Dye is an unincorporated community in Platte County, in the U.S. state of Missouri. It is within the Kansas City metropolitan area.

History
A post office called Dye was established in 1888, and remained in operation until 1902. The community has the name of James Dye, the original owner of the site.

References

Unincorporated communities in Platte County, Missouri
Unincorporated communities in Missouri